The following is a list of active airports that serve the area around Calgary, Alberta, Canada.

Heliports

See also

 List of airports in the Edmonton Metropolitan Region
 List of airports in the Fort McMurray area
 List of airports in the Lethbridge area
 List of airports in the Red Deer area

References

 
Transport in Calgary
Airports Calgary
Airports
Calgary
Calgary